The deputy secretary of homeland security is the chief operating officer of the United States Department of Homeland Security, with responsibility for managing day-to-day operations. The department has over 208,000 employees and an annual budget of more than $48.5 billion.

If the secretary of homeland security dies, resigns, or is otherwise unable to perform the functions and duties of the office, the deputy secretary is to serve as an acting secretary.

The deputy secretary is appointed by the president with the advice and consent of the Senate. The position of Deputy Secretary was created along with the creation of the Department of Homeland Security in 2002. The deputy secretary is paid $168,000 annually.

List of deputy secretaries of homeland security

 Rand Beers served as acting deputy secretary in his capacity as Undersecretary of Homeland Security for National Protection and Programs.

 Rafael Borras served as acting deputy secretary in his capacity as Under Secretary of Homeland Security for Management.

 Russell Deyo served as acting deputy secretary in his capacity as Under Secretary of Homeland Security for Management.

 Claire Grady served as acting deputy secretary in her capacity as Under Secretary of Homeland Security for Management.

 David Pekoske served as acting deputy secretary in his capacity as Administrator of the Transportation Security Administration.

 Ken Cuccinelli served as the senior official performing the duties of deputy secretary in his capacity as Acting Director of United States Citizenship and Immigration Services. His tenure was ruled unlawful.

References

External links
 

 
Homeland Security